Prospekt Mira is a station of the Moscow Metro's Koltsevaya line. Opened on 30 January 1952 as part of the second stage of the line, it is a pylon design by architects Vladimir Gelfreykh and Mikhail Minkus.

Called initially Botanichesky Sad (Ботанический Сад) after the Botanical Garden of Moscow State University which are located nearby, the theme of this station develops the connotation of the name in the overall colour tone. The arches are faced with flared white marble and are topped with ceramic bas-relief frieze made of floral elements. In the centre are medallion bas-reliefs (work of G.Motovilov) featuring the different aspects in the development of agriculture in the Soviet Union. The station walls are laid with dark red Ural marble and chessboard floor pattern is made of grey and black granite. The ceiling vault is decorated with casts, and lighting comes from several cylindrical chandeliers. 

The station's vestibule is built into the ground floor of a multi-story building on the corner of Mira Avenue and Protopopovsky lane. Designed by A.Arkin, its façade features sculptures and an original clock over the two archways. Inside, opposite the escalator hall is a large smalt artwork Mothers of the World by A.Kuznetsov.

In 1958, the wall at the end of the station was dismantled to make way for a transfer to the new station Botanichesky Sad on the Rizhskaya line. In 1966 both stations were renamed after to avoid confusion with the larger Moscow Botanical Garden of Academy of Sciences, which would eventually see the station Botanichesky Sad be named after that in 1978.

In May 2015, the vestibule of the station was closed for one year, due to major refurbishments works, reopened on 16 May 2016.

References

Moscow Metro stations
Stalinist architecture
Railway stations in Russia opened in 1952
Koltsevaya Line
Railway stations located underground in Russia